Zaloše is a settlement on the right bank of the Sava River in the Municipality of Radovljica in the Upper Carniola region of Slovenia.

References

External links
Zaloše at Geopedia

Populated places in the Municipality of Radovljica